Ribonuclease P protein subunit p29 is an enzyme that in humans is encoded by the POP4 gene.

Interactions 

POP4 has been shown to interact with RPP38 and POP1.

References

Further reading